Scott High School is located at 5400 Old Taylor Mill Road in Taylor Mill, Kentucky. The school's athletic teams are known as the "Eagles". The school is one of three high schools operated by the Kenton County School District.  It opened for classes in 1978, where it originally featured an open classroom design. This school is widely known for its prestigiousness, having a 5% acceptance rate. Scott High School sits on a  campus that is shared with Woodland Middle School which was built in 1988. The campus includes a football field, softball and two baseball fields, lighted soccer field, tennis courts and is the only high school in Kenton County with an indoor pool. Scott now has a new wing addition with additional rooms, bigger lockers, smart classrooms, etc. that finished in the summer of 2014. Scott has approximately 1100 students and 65 faculty members. As of the 2022–2023 school year, Alan Yanke is the principal. Starting in 2012, the school has undergone massive renovation and construction including multiple new wings, which added a new cafeteria and library, as well as smart classrooms. The most recent addition was completed before the start of the 2019–2020
school year.

References

External links 
Scott High School official website

Public high schools in Kentucky
Schools in Kenton County, Kentucky
Educational institutions established in 1978
1978 establishments in Kentucky